Stacey Smith is an ice dancer.

Stacey Smith may also refer to:

Stacey-Ann Smith
Stacey Smith (curler) in 2009 Ontario Scotties Tournament of Hearts
Stacey Smith (Delaware) in Miss Delaware USA
Stacey Smith (golfer) in NCAA Division III Women's Golf Championships
Stacey Smith (judoka) in Judo at the 1991 European Youth Olympic Days
Stacey Smith (runner) in Athletics at the 2011 Summer Universiade – Women's 1500 metres

See also
Stacy Smith (disambiguation)